The West Lake Resortopia is a theme park in Sanyi Township, Miaoli County, Taiwan.

History
The theme park was established in 1989. Later on it was renovated to have a theme of Hans Christian Andersen.

Architecture
The theme park spans over an area of 60 hectares and was constructed with a European style of architecture. It is divided into two main areas, which are the amusement park and the cartoon world.

Notable events
 2010 Miaoli Triathlon

Transportation
The theme park is accessible by taxi south of Sanyi Station of Taiwan Railways.

See also
 List of tourist attractions in Taiwan

References

External links

  

1989 establishments in Taiwan
Amusement parks in Taiwan
Amusement parks opened in 1989
Buildings and structures in Miaoli County
Tourist attractions in Miaoli County